Tarrant Abbey was a Cistercian nunnery in Tarrant Crawford, Dorset, England.

History
The abbey was founded as an independent monastery in 1186 by Ralph de Kahaines (of nearby Tarrant Keyneston) and has been identified as a possible site of "Camestrum", referred to by Gervase of Canterbury. The abbey was then re-founded in either 1228 or 1233 as a Cistercian nunnery, later supposedly the richest in England.

Two famous people are associated with the abbey. The first is Queen Joan, the wife of Alexander II of Scotland and daughter of King John of England, who is buried in the graveyard (supposedly in a golden coffin). The second is Bishop Richard Poore, builder of Salisbury Cathedral, who was baptised in the abbey church and later (in 1237) buried in it, as its second founder.

The church of St Mary the Virgin, the parish church of Tarrant Crawford, is all that remains of Tarrant Abbey. It was the lay church of the abbey and was built in the 12th century. It has now been designated as a Grade I listed building and is now in the care of the Churches Conservation Trust. The site of the abbey is a Scheduled monument containing mostly buried remains.

Known Abbesses of Tarrant Abbey
 Claricia, elected about 1228 
 Emelina 
 Maud, occurs 1240 
 Isolda, occurs 1280 
 Elena, elected 1298 
 Anne, occurs 1351  
 Clemence de Cernyngton, occurs 1377  
 Joan, occurs 1402  
 Avice, occurs 1404 
 Edith Coker, died in 1535  
 Margaret Lynde (uncertain)
 Margaret Russell, elected 1535, surrendered to Henry VIII in March 1539.

References

Monasteries in Dorset
Cistercian nunneries in England
Christian monasteries established in the 12th century
12th-century establishments in England
12th-century church buildings in England
Grade I listed churches in Dorset
Grade I listed monasteries